Andrew Clifford Warrington (born 10 June 1976) is an English former professional footballer and the current first team goalkeeping coach at Derby County. He played as a goalkeeper for York City, Doncaster Rovers, Bury, Rotherham United, Buxton and Grimsby Town.

Playing career

York City
Warrington's first professional club was York City, whom he joined in 1994 as a YTS trainee. Most notably, he was on the bench when they famously beat Manchester United in a League Cup tie at Old Trafford. An injury to York City's then first choice goalkeeper, Dean Kiely, meant Warrington was required to make his debut for the Minstermen in the return fixture at Bootham Crescent. While York City eventually lost the game 1–3, to a Manchester United team containing Schmeichel, Beckham, Giggs, Scholes, Cole and Cantona amongst others, it was enough to see the Yorkshire side into the next round.

The following season saw Warrington involved again as York City pulled off another League Cup shock with a 3–2 victory over Everton at Bootham Crescent, after the first game at Goodison Park ended in a 1–1 draw.

During the five years he spent with the club he made 61 appearances.

Doncaster Rovers
In 1999, Warrington joined another Yorkshire club Doncaster Rovers. Arguably, his best days were spent at Rovers, and Warrington was an ever-present in his first season at the club. Then, after breaking his jaw in a game at Southport, the following season, he was forced to spend several months on the sidelines.

He was part of the team that won the 2003 Football Conference Playoff Final held at the Britannia Stadium, after saving two crucial penalty kicks in the shoot-out against Chester City to decide the semi-final. The following year, with Warrington as first choice goalkeeper, Doncaster Rovers went on to win the 2003–04 Third Division title.

On 21 September 2005, during extra time in a League Cup tie against Premier League side Manchester City, Warrington was again seriously injured after a collision with City's Nedum Onuoha. While Rovers went on to win the game, Warrington would never play a competitive game again for the South Yorkshire side. 
He was a fans' favourite at the club, where he made 196 league appearances during an incredible eight years at Belle Vue.

Bury
In November 2006, Bury agreed a loan deal for Warrington from Doncaster Rovers, however he only made one league appearance. The following year, in January 2007, Bury then signed him on a permanent basis where he would make a further 19 appearances in the season before moving on from Gigg Lane.

Rotherham United
In 2007, Rotherham United moved in for Warrington. Within the first two years of his arrival at the club, Warrington had already made 97 appearances, firstly at Millmoor and then at the Don Valley Stadium. Issues off the field at the time, however, meant that Warrington's, and the team's, excellent performances on it were left unrewarded. The club were deducted 10 points during the 2007–08 season and 17 points prior to the start of 2008–09 season, without which playoff qualification would have been achieved.

The culmination of the 2009–10 season, however, saw Warrington and his Rotherham United teammates play at Wembley Stadium, as they narrowly missed out on promotion to League 1, following defeat in the League 2 Playoff Final.

On 26 January 2013, Warrington made his 200th league appearance for Rotherham United against his former team York City at the New York Stadium, as he continued to keep summer signing Scott Shearer out of the team, following his recall earlier in the campaign. During the 2012–13 season, in what proved to be his last with Rotherham United, Andy made 27 league appearances, as The Millers achieved promotion to League 1, finishing in 2nd place in League 2.

On 2 May 2013 Rotherham manager Steve Evans announced the club had decided to release the fans' favourite with immediate effect, describing it as "as tough a decision as I have had to make in my managerial career"

Buxton
On 27 July 2013, Warrington signed a contract with Northern Premier League outfit Buxton for the 2013–14 season, after featuring for The Bucks during their pre-season fixtures. He began his Northern Premier League career at Silverlands by keeping four clean sheets in his first 10 games.

Coaching career
Warrington completed the UEFA 'B' football coaching licence in 2013.

It was announced in July 2015 that Andy had accepted the role of full-time Goalkeeping Coach at Grimsby Town in the National League. Manager Paul Hurst confirmed on Grimsby's 'Mariners World' on 16 July 2015, that Warrington would also be No 2 while youth Callum Bastock continues his rehabilitation from a knee cruciate ligament injury and deputise for first choice goalkeeper James McKeown. 
Grimsby having already won a play-off spot; Warrington played in the final game of the 2015–16 season against Tranmere Rovers.

Warrington was a member of the squad that eventually gained promotion with Grimsby's 3–1 victory over Forest Green Rovers in the 2016 National League play-off Final at Wembley, seeing Grimsby promoted to League Two after a six-year absence from the Football League. On 21 June 2018 Warrington left Grimsby.

On 10 July 2018 Warrington joined Lincoln City.

In December 2019, Warrington joined Rotherham United as goalkeeping coach.

Honours
Doncaster Rovers
 Football Conference playoff winner: 2002–03
 Football League Division Three winner: 2003–04

Rotherham United
 Football League Two runner-up: 2012–13

Grimsby Town
 National League Play-offs Winners (1): 2015–16

References

External links
 
 

1976 births
Living people
Footballers from Sheffield
English footballers
Association football goalkeepers
Northern Premier League players
National League (English football) players
English Football League players
York City F.C. players
Doncaster Rovers F.C. players
Bury F.C. players
Rotherham United F.C. players
Buxton F.C. players
Grimsby Town F.C. players
Grimsby Town F.C. non-playing staff
Lincoln City F.C. non-playing staff
Rotherham United F.C. non-playing staff
Association football goalkeeping coaches